E32 may refer to: 
 BMW E32
 European route E32
 Tokushima Expressway (between Tokushima JCT and Kawanoe-higashi JCT) and Kōchi Expressway (between Kawanoe JCT and Kochi IC), route E32 in Japan
 West Coast Expressway, route E32 in Malaysia
 Long Win Bus Route E32 in Hong Kong